Seervarisai is a 1978 Indian Tamil-language film written and directed by K. Sornam, and produced by Kovai Chezhiyan. The film stars Muthuraman and Lakshmi. It was released on 15 September 1978.

Plot

Cast 
 Muthuraman
 Lakshmi
 Thengai Srinivasan
 Srikanth
 Ashokan
 T. K. Bhagavathi
 Vennira Aadai Moorthy
 Manorama
 Sukumari

Soundtrack 
The music was composed by M. S. Viswanathan, with lyrics by Kannadasan. The LP records were released in 1973.

Release and reception 
Seervarisai was released on 15 September 1978. Kousigan of Kalki said that, had the film been released earlier, the storyline would have seemed innovative to viewers, but now looked like a much older film.

References

External links 
 

1970s Tamil-language films
Films directed by K. Sornam
Films scored by M. S. Viswanathan